Gilles Quispel (30 May 1916 – 2 March 2006) was a Dutch theologian and historian of Christianity and Gnosticism. He was professor of early Christian history at Utrecht University.

Born in Rotterdam, after finishing secondary school in Dordrecht, Quispel studied classical philology from 1934 to 1941 at the Leiden University. At Leiden he also began to study theology, which he continued at the University of Groningen. Quispel completed his doctoral work in 1943 at Utrecht University with a dissertation examining the sources utilized in Tertullian's Adversus Marcionem. He devoted study to several Gnostic systems, particularly Valentinianism. In 1948-1949 he spent a year in Rome as a Bollingen fellow and was appointed Professor of the History of the Early Church at Utrecht University in 1951. Quispel served as a visiting professor at Harvard University in 1964-1965 and at the Katholieke Universiteit Leuven in 1968. He was engaged in first editing Nag Hammadi Codex I (the "Jung Codex") and devoted attention to the Nag Hammadi Library and particularly to the Gospel of Thomas throughout the rest of his career. Quispel also made contributions to the study of early "Jewish-Christian" traditions as well as Tatian's Diatessaron (a second-century gospel harmony). He died in El Gouna, Egypt.

Works
 The Original Doctrine of Valentine, Amsterdam, North-Holland 1947.
 A Jewish Source of Minucius Felix, 1949.
 Gnosis als Weltreligion, 1951.
 Faust: Symbol of Western Man, 1967.
 Gnosis and The New Sayings of Jesus, Rhein-Verlag, 1971.
 The Birth of The Child: Some Gnostic and Jewish Aspects, Leiden: Brill 1973.
 From Mythos to Logos, Leiden: Brill 1973.
 Gnostic Studies, 2 vols., Istanbul, 1974.
 Tatian and the Gospel of Thomas: Studies in the History of the Western Diatessaron, Leiden: Brill 1975. 
 The Secret Book of Revelation: The Last Book of The Bible, New York: McGraw-Hill, 1979. 
 Gnosis and Psychology, Leiden: Brill 1973.
 Jewish and Gnostic Man, (Eranos Lecures) 1986.
 Gnostica, Judaica, Catholica. Collected Essays of Gilles Quispel, edited by Johannes van Oort, Leiden: Brill 2008.

Commemorative publications

R. van den Broek and M. J. Vermaseren (eds.), Studies in Gnosticism and Hellenistic Religions: Presented to Gilles Quispel on the Occasion of His 65th Birthday (Leiden 1981) 

1916 births
2006 deaths
20th-century Dutch  historians
Dutch historians of religion
Historians of Gnosticism
Leiden University alumni
Writers from Rotterdam
Utrecht University alumni
Academic staff of Utrecht University